Pat Ryan (born 1938 in Littleton, County Tipperary) is an Irish former sportsperson.  He played hurling with his local club Moycarkey–Borris and was a member of the Tipperary senior inter-county team in the 1960s. Ryan won a two All-Ireland and Munster titles with Tipperary in 1961 and 1964.

References

1938 births
Living people
Moycarkey-Borris hurlers
Tipperary inter-county hurlers